Below is a list of notable footballers who have played for Buriram United.

List of players

Key to positions

 
Buriram United
Association football player non-biographical articles